The Alley Spring Roller Mill, also known as Red Mill, is a historic grist mill located in the Ozark National Scenic Riverways near Eminence, Shannon County, Missouri.  It was built in 1893, and is a 2 1/2-story, rectangular frame building on a limestone block foundation.  It measures 32 feet by 42 feet and houses four steel rollers and a single stone burr.

In 2017, the mill was featured in the U.S. Mint America the Beautiful Quarters series. The design is an image of Alley Mill that was created by Renata Gordon and sculpted by Ron Sanders.

It was listed on the National Register of Historic Places in 1981.

References

Grinding mills on the National Register of Historic Places in Missouri
Industrial buildings completed in 1893
Buildings and structures in Shannon County, Missouri
National Register of Historic Places in Shannon County, Missouri
1893 establishments in Missouri